Ingrid Torrance (born 1969 in British Columbia) is a Canadian actor best known for her role as a spokesperson on NBCi.com.

She is a Canadian actor, acting instructor and author. She has been a television and movie actor since 1994, an acting teacher since 1995, and a coach since 1998. Ingrid is a voting member of the American Academy of Motion Pictures.  In 1998, she was nominated as Best Actress for a Leo Award and in March, 2001, she was featured in Entertainment Weekly as a "Breakout" Actress.

Filmography

Actor

Actor Coach

Director

Associate Producer

Casting Director

Author

References

External links
 
 Official website

1969 births
Living people
20th-century Canadian actresses
21st-century Canadian actresses
Actresses from British Columbia
Canadian acting coaches
Canadian film actresses
Canadian stage actresses
Canadian television actresses
People from New Westminster
People from North Vancouver